The 1968 United States Senate election in Connecticut took place on November 5, 1968. Incumbent Democratic U.S. Senator Abraham Ribicoff was re-elected to a second term in office over Republican U.S. Representative Edwin H. May Jr.

General election

Results

See also 
 1968 United States Senate elections

References 

1968 Connecticut elections
1968
Connecticut